Jennifer Warnes is the fourth album by American singer/songwriter Jennifer Warnes, released in late 1976 as her inaugural Arista Records album. It was her first album to be credited as Jennifer Warnes, after being credited as simply "Jennifer" on her first three albums. The disc generated Warnes' first Billboard Hot 100 single "Right Time of the Night" which also ranked on the Billboard hit listings of C&W and Easy Listening tracks, with "Right Time..." reaching No. 1 on the latter. The second single, "I'm Dreaming" also reached the Easy Listening top ten.

Warnes had been signed by Arista Records president Clive Davis in April 1975 on the recommendation of Jim Price, and from May 1975 Price oversaw sessions - at the Village Recorder in west-LA - for tracks intended for Warnes' inaugural Arista album. Price, producing Warnes sporadically as his work schedule permitted - (Jennifer Warnes quote:) "[Price was] producing,...arranging, singing, engineering, playing horns and so forth [for various artists]" - , could not present Clive Davis with the completed tracks Price intended to comprise Warnes' inaugural Arista album until the summer of 1976.

Davis' reaction to the intended album for Warnes was (Clive Davis quote): "It was a good enough album but it didn't have anything on it that could give her the hit single she needs", and Davis resultantly recruited  Jim Ed Norman to produce two tracks to supplement Price's work, with Norman overseeing Warnes' sessions for the tracks "Right Time of the Night" and "I'm Dreamin" at Davlen Sound Studios in July 1976. (Jennifer Warnes quote:): "Clive picked 'I'm Dreaming' and 'Right Time of the Night', and he brought in Jim Ed Norman...to give those songs very explicit tracks"- Norman, who had been a member of Don Henley's pre-Eagles band Shiloh, having overseen string arrangements for the Eagles' albums Desperado and One of These Nights and also having arranged strings for Linda Ronstadt's version of "Desperado" (album Don't Cry Now/ 1973).  (Jennifer Warnes quote:):"Because of the amount of money Linda Ronstadt was making for Asylum [Records] Arista pretty much saw me as [their] ticket [to similar success]."

Clive Davis also assigned Val Garay to mix "Right Time of the Night" and "I'm Dreaming" and also remix Warnes' Jim Price-produced tracks: Garay had mixed the Linda Ronstadt albums Heart Like a Wheel and Prisoner in Disguise and around the time of his work on the Jennifer Warnes album was working on Ronstadt's album Hasten Down the Wind. The production costs of the Jim Price sessions with Jennifer Warnes had totaled $60,000: the recording of the two supplementary tracks: "Right Time..." and "I'm Dreaming", plus the expenditure for the Garay remix upped the production costs of the Jennifer Warnes album to a $115,000 total.

After scheduling the Jennifer Warnes album for August 1976 release, Davis elected to hold back release until the new year, deeming Warnes' album likely to be lost in the holiday season sales boom. Both the album and its lead single "Right Time of the Night" would in fact be released 1 January 1977 with the Jennifer Warnes album debuting at No. 189 on the Billboard 200 album chart dated 26 February 1977, which in that week "Right Time of the Night" entered the top 40 of the Billboard Hot 100 en route to a No. 6 peak that May with the Jennifer Warnes album peaking at No. 43 the same month.

Track listing 
"Love Hurts" (Boudleaux Bryant) – 3:20
"Round and Round" (Daniel Moore) – 4:41
"Shine a Light" (Mick Jagger, Keith Richards) – 4:12
"You're the One" (Stephen Ferguson) – 4:22
"I'm Dreaming" (Richard Kerr, Gary Osborne) – 3:32
"Mama" (Stephen Ferguson) – 2:11
"Right Time of the Night" (Peter McCann) – 2:55
"Bring Ol' Maggie Back Home" (Daniel Moore) – 4:29
"Don't Lead Me On" (Doug Haywood) – 2:58
"Daddy Don't Go" (Jennifer Warnes) – 4:54
"O God of Loveliness (O Bello Dio Del Paradiso)" (Alphonsus Liguori; translated by Rev. Paradiso E. Vaughan) – 1:11

Charts

Personnel

Jennifer Warnes – vocals, backing vocals
Peggy Sandvig – piano, electric piano
Dave McDaniel – bass
Jay Graydon – guitar
Jim Price – electric piano, organ, trombone, backing vocals
Jim Horn – flute, English horn, alto saxophone
Nicky Hopkins – piano
Russ Kunkel – drums
Danny Kortchmar – guitar
Doug Livingston – piano, steel guitar
John Leslie Hug – guitar
Joe Correro – drums
Alan Lindgren – piano
Brian Whitcomb – keyboards
Kenny Edwards – guitar
Dan Sawyer – guitar
Doug Rhone – guitar
Ben Benay – guitar
Reinie Press – bass
Mike Bowden – bass
Dennis St. John – drums
Matt Betton – drums
Ralph Humphrey – drums
Gayle Levant – harp
Laudir de Oliveira – percussion
Steve Madaio – trumpet
Skip Mesquite – tenor saxophone
Max Haskett – trumpet
Herb Pedersen – backing vocals
Doug Haywood, Daniel Moore, Matthew Moore, Jim Moore, Beth Fitchet Wood – background vocals
James Getzoff, Ray Kelley, Sid Sharp, Bill Kerausch - strings

Technical
Andy Johns, Ed Lever, Eric Prestidge, Gary Starr, Jim Price, Joe Tuzon, Larry Quinn, Michael Lietz, Nat Seligman, Neil Brody, Rob Fraboni, Stephen Barncard, Tim Kramer, Zak Zenor - engineer
Val Garay - engineer, mixing
Norman Seeff - design

References

1976 albums
Arista Records albums
Jennifer Warnes albums
Albums produced by Jim Ed Norman